Lin Pardey (born 1944) and Larry Pardey (1939-2020) are sailors and writers, known for their small boat sailing. They coined the phrase, "Go Small, Go Simple, but Go Now., and have been called the "Enablers" as their example encouraged many others to set sail despite limited incomes. The Pardeys sailed over 200,000 miles together, circumnavigating the world both east-about and west-about, and have published numerous books on sailing. The boats they sailed during these circumnavigations were engine-free.

Early life
Larry was born October 31, 1939 in Victoria, British Columbia and Lin was born 1944 in Detroit, Michigan.
Larry Pardey met Lin Zatkin in May 1965 in California. The couple married in 1968.

Sailing voyages
The Pardeys have sailed, contrary to the prevailing wind, past all the great southern capes, including Cape Horn. Larry and Lin built the two boats they used for two circumnavigations; both were under 30 feet and were designed by Lyle Hess. Neither boat had an engine.

Larry also was one of the first people to sail across the Sahara in 1967. In an expedition organized by the French Colonel de Buchett and sponsored by National Geographic among others, he captained a North American team of thre,e including Richard Arthur and Warren Zeibarth, as they sailed land yachts from Colum Bechar in Algeria to Noachott in Mauritania, a distance of approximately 1700 miles. For this, each was awarded the Mauritanian Legion of Honor. In 1974, he joined 67-year-old Leslie Dyball to take handicap honors in the bi-annual Round Britain and Ireland two-handed race onboard the 30-foot S&S sloop Chough.

Larry started his sailing career at age 17 in North Vancouver where he restored an El Toro dinghy and became a member of the West Vancouver Yacht Club. He quickly became proficient in racing and purchased then restored a 28-foot Tumlaren sloop, Annalisa. His skills led to him being asked to instruct others in the art of racing and also to lead the junior sailing program. In 1964, he sold Annalisa and went to California in search of an affordable cruising boat. He instead signed as first mate on the 85-foot schooner, Double Eagle, and sailed to Hawaii on a movie-making charter. On his return, he obtained a job skippering a 54-foot charter ketch and at the same time began building his first cruising boat, Seraffyn. Five months into this project, he met Lin Zatkin, who was completely new to sailing. She soon joined him to finish building what became their first cruising boat. Together, they eventually sailed more than 200,000 miles, including both an east about and west about circumnavigation. To earn their way, they delivered boats, restored boats and worked as riggers. Eventually, Lin's writing skills began adding significantly to their cruising funds. Larry began writing practical articles and after about 15 years of cruising, writing and presenting seminars covering their cruising costs.

In 1985, during a voyage to New Zealand, the two purchased a distressed small boatyard and cottage on Kawau Island, 30 miles north of Auckland. This became their home base but did not stop them from voyaging onward. In total, they voyaged together for 40 of the 51 years they spent together.

Later life

In 2009, the Pardeys made their last ocean passage together from California to Tonga and New Zealand. Larry had already developed Parkinson's disease by this time. Thus, their cruising was confined to the coast of New Zealand. In 2016, with Larry no longer able to move without assistance, Lin sold their 29'9" Hess cutter, Taleisin, to a young New Zealand couple who, within two years, voyaged to Tonga and continued to live on board her once back in New Zealand. Larry went into an assisted living facility in 2017. Lin continued sailing as crew of Sahula, a steel Van de Stadt cutter owned by David Haigh, a retired environmental law lecturer who was completing an 11-year circumnavigation. During the next years, between visits back to ensure Larry was getting the best possible care, she logged another 20,000 miles voyaging to Fiji, Vanuatu and along the coast of Australia and south of Tasmania to return to her home in New Zealand. 

Larry died on July 27, 2020.

Friends of Larry Pardey contributed to a fund to create a Memorial Observatory and Shelter area at Camp Bentzon, directly across the cove from the home Larry and Lin built on Kawau Island. Over 5,000 school children visit this non-denominational outdoor recreation facility for week-long adventure programs. This was dedicated in April of 2022 with a plaque that reads: 

Larry's place – outdoors, warm and friendly  

Made possible by friends of Larry Pardey

Publications
Together, Lin and Larry have written twelve books and created five instructional DVD programs. Parts of these programs have been aired on PBS television.

Lin has written two additional books under her own name and published three maritime titles for other authors.

In January 2014, As Long as It's Fun: The Epic Voyages and Extraordinary Times of Lin and Larry Pardey, a biography written by Herb McCormick, was released by Paradise Cay Publications.

Awards
The Cruising Club of America awarded their 2009 Far Horizon Award to Lin and Larry in recognition of their combined voyaging on board many boats covering mileage totaling more than 200,000 for Larry and about 194,000 for Lin and doing so in a manner that is consistent with the goals of the CCA. They were presented with the SSCA award from the Seven Seas Cruising Association in recognition of their contributions to the sport of sailing and the cruising community – only the 16th time in the club's 60-year history the award has been presented.

Mauritanian Legion of Honour, as Captain of first American team to sail across the Sahara Desert in a land yacht 1967. 
Outstanding Sailor of the year – West Vancouver Yacht Club 1978
French Sailing Federation – Silver medal, Landyachting 1967
Cruising Sailors to contribute most to the sport of Sailing – voted by readers of Sail Magazine 1990.
International Oceanic Award – presented by Royal Institute of Navigation sponsored by Little Ship Club 1995 - in recognition of Larry's voyaging using traditional methods of navigation.
Larry won the International Oceanic Award from the Royal Institute of Navigation in 1996, and was presented this honour by the Princess Royal, Princess Anne in 1997.
Ocean Cruising Club Award – for contributions to Seamanship for small boat sailing.  Presented to Lin Pardey 1996. 
Geoff Pac Memorial Award – to both Lin and Larry for fostering and encouraging ocean cruising in small yachts 1998 and 2001
Cruising World Hall of Fame – 2000
Ocean Cruising Club Merit Award – To Lin and Larry for inspiring voyages including a west-about rounding of Cape Horn 2003
Seven Seas Cruising Club Service Award – To Lin and Larry for their lifetime voyaging achievements 2004
Cruising Club of America Far Horizons Award – To Lin and Larry for lifetime achievements and contributions to seamanship 2009
Sail Magazines Top 40 Sailors who made a Difference–2010- Citation – As America's first couple of cruising, Lin and Larry have inspired countless sailors.
Yachting Monthly – 25 Cruising Heroes Only non-British sailors chosen. March 2012
Seven Seas Cruising Association – SSCA Award for contributions to the sailing community October 2015
BoatUS – Leaders and Legends 2016 – Named among 50 people who made a difference to the world of boating
Ocean Cruising Club 2019 – lifetime achievement award
2022 Inducted into the U.S. National Sailing Hall of Fame

Bibliography

Books
Cruising in Seraffyn 
Seraffyns European Adventure 
Seraffyn'''s Mediterranean Adventure 
Seraffyns Oriental Adventure Storm Tactics Handbook The Cost Conscious Cruiser The Self Sufficient Sailor The Capable Cruiser The Care and Feeding of Sailing Crew Details of Classic Boat Construction:  The Hull Bull Canyon, a Boatbuilder, a Writer and Other Wildlife  Willa Cather Literary Award, Creative non-fiction 2012 - finalist Indie Book Awards - General Non-Fiction, also MemoirsTaleisin's Tales, Cruising Towards the Southern Cross 

VHS tapesCruising Coral SeasCruising with Lin and Larry PardeyVoyaging with Lin and Larry PardeyThe Care and Feeding of Sailing CrewStorm TacticsDVDCruising Has No Limits Get Ready to CruiseGet Ready to Cross OceansStorm TacticsCost Control While You Cruise ''

Further reading

References

 Adlard Coles Heavy Weather Sailing, 6th Edition edited by Peter Bruce
 BoatUS, April/May 2016 - Leaders and Legends who moved the needle in the sport of boating

External links

https://pardeytime.blogspot.com/
Lin and Larry Pardey official website Archived web page
Interview with the Pardeys at 48 North

Living people
Canadian sailors
American sailors
Maritime writers
Female sailors
American sportswomen
Year of birth missing (living people)
21st-century American women